The International Polka Association (IPA) is located in Chicago, Illinois and dedicated to the study and preservation of polka music and the cultural heritage of Polish Americans who have made this music tradition part of their heritage. The IPA hosts an annual festival and convention as well as its Annual Polka Music Awards banquet. During the banquet, important figures in polka music are inducted into the Polka Hall of Fame.

History
The concept of a national polka convention had been developed and pioneered in Chicago, and the first polka convention was held in 1963. This convention developed into the International Polka Convention which was presented each succeeding year in Chicago, Detroit and Buffalo, New York.  In 1968, a steering committee began preparations for the formation of the International Polka Association. The association was officially chartered by the State of Illinois as a "not for profit" corporation and was registered with the County of Cook (Chicago) in August 1968

As stated in its charter, the International Polka Association was organized as: "An educational and charitable organization for the preservation, promulgation and advancement of polka music and; to promote, maintain and advance public interest in polka entertainment; to advance the mutual interests and encourage greater cooperation among its members who are engaged in polka entertainment; and to encourage and pursue the study of polka music, dancing and traditional folklore."

The IPA is structured to serve as an educational resource.  The IPA is also responsible for the continued operation and growth of its Polka Music Hall of Fame. It is through this branch that the association has been able to continue its historical, educational and research goals on behalf of polka music. The IPA Hall of Fame is located atop Polonia Banquets, a century-old dance hall at 4608 S. Archer Ave. in Chicago's Brighton Park neighborhood, and is open by appointment.

Hall of Fame membership

See also
Polka Hall of Fame
List of music organizations in the United States

References

External links
International Polka Association.

Polka
Music organizations based in the United States
Dance organizations
Non-profit organizations based in Chicago
Polish-American culture in Chicago